The C&C 36R is a Canadian sailboat, that was designed by C&C Design and first built in 1971.

Production
The boat was built by C&C Yachts in Canada, starting in 1971, but it is now out of production.

Design
The C&C 36R is a small recreational keelboat, built predominantly of fiberglass, with wood trim. It has a masthead sloop rig, a transom-hung rudder, vertical transom and a fixed swept fin keel. It displaces  and carries  of ballast.

See also
List of sailing boat types

Similar sailboats
Bayfield 36
Beneteau 361
C&C 34/36
C&C 35
C&C 110
Catalina 36
Columbia 36
Coronado 35
Ericson 36
Express 35
Frigate 36
Goderich 35
Hinterhoeller F3
Hughes 36
Hughes-Columbia 36
Hunter 35 Legend
Hunter 35.5 Legend
Hunter 36
Hunter 36-2
Hunter 36 Legend
Hunter 36 Vision
Invader 36
Islander 36
Mirage 35
Nonsuch 36
Portman 36
Seidelmann 37
Vancouver 36 (Harris)
Watkins 36
Watkins 36C

References

Keelboats
1970s sailboat type designs
Sailing yachts
Sailboat type designs by C&C Design
Sailboat types built by C&C Yachts